Margaret Simpson (born 31 December 1981 in Krapa) is a Ghanaian heptathlete. She won a bronze medal at the 2005 World Championships, setting several personal bests in the process. Her personal best is 6423 points, achieved in Götzis in May 2005.

Biography
In one of her earliest international senior performances, she placed fourth at the 1999 All-Africa Games. She was the junior champion at the 1999 African Junior Athletics Championships, but failed to finish in the event at the 2000 World Junior Championships in Athletics. She was selected for the heptathlon at the 2001 World Championships in Athletics and placed 13th overall. Senior success came the following year as she took the bronze medal at the 2002 Commonwealth Games and then won the heptathlon gold medal at the 2002 African Championships in Athletics. She failed to finish at the 2003 World Championships in Athletics. In 2004, Simpson became African Champion for a second time and followed this result with a ninth place at the 2004 Athens Olympics.

Simpson reached the global podium for the first time at the 2005 World Championships in Athletics, taking third place with the second best performance of her career with a tally of 6375 points. She had set a personal best of 6423 points at the Hypo-Meeting earlier that season. She missed the 2006 season but returned the year after with a gold medal performance at the 2007 All-Africa Games. She failed to finish at the 2007 World Championships in Athletics later that season. She missed all of the 2008 season after this. She was off form in 2009 and registered a season's best of 5872 points at the Meeting International d'Arles. She was back to good form at the 2010 African Championships in Athletics, where she won a third heptathlon title in a score of 6031 points. She also managed eighth in the high jump for African at the 2010 IAAF Continental Cup.

She won the 2011 edition of the Multistars meeting in Desenzano del Garda with a score of 6270 points, defeating the 2010 champion Marina Goncharova. She was fourteenth at the 2011 World Championships in Athletics and won a third straight title at the 2011 All-Africa Games. She won the African Combined Events Championships in both 2011 and 2012.

She withdrew from the heptathlon at the 2012 Summer Olympics due to a kidney infection.

Simpson is renowned for her strong javelin throw, her personal best in which is 56.36 metres.

Achievements

Competition record

2011 World Championships

References

External links

1981 births
Living people
Ghanaian heptathletes
Athletes (track and field) at the 2004 Summer Olympics
Olympic athletes of Ghana
Athletes (track and field) at the 2002 Commonwealth Games
Athletes (track and field) at the 2010 Commonwealth Games
World Athletics Championships medalists
Commonwealth Games bronze medallists for Ghana
Ghanaian female athletes
Commonwealth Games medallists in athletics
African Games gold medalists for Ghana
African Games medalists in athletics (track and field)
Athletes (track and field) at the 1999 All-Africa Games
Athletes (track and field) at the 2003 All-Africa Games
Athletes (track and field) at the 2007 All-Africa Games
Athletes (track and field) at the 2011 All-Africa Games
Medallists at the 2002 Commonwealth Games